The 7.62×53mmR (also known as the 7.6×53R Finnish) rifle cartridge is a Finnish design based on the Russian 7.62×54mmR round dating back to 1891.

History
After gaining its independence in 1917 and after the Finnish Civil War of 1918, large numbers of Model 1891 Mosin–Nagant rifles were in the hands of the Finnish military. As the old barrels were worn out, they were replaced by new 7.83 mm (.308 in) barrels and the leftover 7.62×54mmR cartridges being in short supply, a domestic product was needed. This gave birth to the 7.62×53mmR.

In the late 1930s the Finnish Army started loading military cartridges with domestically produced 7.87 mm (.310 in) diameter D166 bullets as the production of new M39 "Ukko-Pekka" rifles barreled for 7.62×54R diameter bullets started. This change was due in part to allow the use of captured Soviet ammunition and machine gun ammunition which often was of a slightly greater bore diameter than its Finnish counterparts. The rifling twist rate was also changed from 300 mm (1 in 11.81 in) to 254 mm (1 in 10 in).

The 7.62×53mmR cartridge remains in military use to this day, although it is now only used by the 7.62 TKIV 85 sniper rifle. PKM machine guns and other Russian weapons in use by the Finnish Defence Forces use the 7.62×54mmR exclusively.
The Finnish Defence Forces issued instructions that when ever possible, personnel issued with a rifle chambered for 7.62×53mmR (effectively the TKIV 85 rifle) should use 7.62×53mmR ammunition only, and that use of 7.62×54mmR is only allowed when 7.62×53mmR is not available.

Cartridge dimensions
The 7.62×53mmR has 4.16 ml (64 grains) H2O cartridge case capacity. The exterior shape of the case was designed to promote reliable case feeding and extraction in bolt-action rifles and machine guns alike, under extreme conditions.

7.62×53mmR maximum C.I.P. cartridge dimensions.All sizes in millimeters (mm).

Americans would define the shoulder angle at alpha/2 ≈ 18.5 degrees. The common rifling twist rate for this cartridge is 300 mm (1 in 11.81 in), 4 grooves, Ø lands = 7.59 mm, Ø grooves = 7.83 mm, land width = 4.20 mm and the primer type used to be Berdan, but nowadays large rifle is more common.

According to the official C.I.P. (Commission Internationale Permanente pour l'Epreuve des Armes à Feu Portatives) guidelines the 7.62 × 53 R case can handle up to 390 MPa (56,564 psi) piezo pressure. In C.I.P. regulated countries every rifle cartridge combo has to be proofed at 125% of this maximum C.I.P. pressure to certify for sale to consumers.

Differences between 7.62×53mmR (Finland) and 7.62×54mmR (Russia)
According to official C.I.P. rulings the TDCC sheets the 7.62 × 53 R and 7.62 × 54 R feature differences. C.I.P. rulings are indisputable legally binding for civilian use in C.I.P. member states like Finland and Russia. Only governmental organizations, like military and police forces and other firearms bearing public power agencies, from the C.I.P. member states are legally exempted from having to comply with C.I.P. rulings.

Some dimensional differences between the C.I.P. 7.62 × 53 R and 7.62 × 54 R TDCC sheets:
 Round length (L6): 77.00 mm (54R: 77.16)
 Case length (L3): 53.50 mm (54R: 53.72)
 Rim diameter (R1): 14.40 mm (54R: 14.48)
 Bullet diameter (G1): 7.85 mm (54R: 7.92)

The Finnish commercial ammunition manufacturer Lapua does not make a difference between the 53R and 54R, but produces cartridges that will function in weapons chambered for either one.

The Russian ammunition maker Barnaul states that Russian cartridges marked 7.62×53 are the same as 7.62×54.
From their web site:
"Some hunters have been confused because there have been varying marking on the package, case bottom and stamps: 7.62×53: 7.62×53R: 7.62×54: 7.62×54R. This happened because the 53.72 mm case length was rounded off differently in various countries. After Russia became a member of the European Permanent Coordinated Commission, the final name - "7.62×54R" - of the cartridge was accepted. "

Additionally, Russian ammunition manufacturer LVE (Novosibirsk Cartridge Plant) states, "The cartridges cal.7,62×54R are produced by various producers around the world. Producers mark these cartridges differently, and this leads to confusion among the customers – 7.62х53; 7.62×53R; 7.62х54; 7.62×54R. The confusion is based on difference in rounding out (rounding up or rounding down) the case length (case length of our cartridges is 53.65-0.2 mm). The letter "R" indicates a case rim. After Russia’s joining European Commission (ПМК) a definite name of this cartridge was determined – 7,62×54R. Therefore, you may use cartridges of caliber 7.62х54R freely with your arms [marked as 7.62×53R]."

See also
 7.62 mm caliber
 Dragunov SVD
 Mosin–Nagant
 Degtyerev DP-28
 PK machine gun
 Russian M1910 Maxim
 7.62 Tkiv 85
 Lahti-Saloranta M/26

References

 C.I.P. CD-ROM edition 2003
 C.I.P. decisions, texts and tables (free current C.I.P. CD-ROM version download (ZIP and RAR format))

External links
 An evaluation list for variants, weights, and velocities of this ammunition type
 A dimensional diagram of the cartridge
 A description of the cartridge at Chuckhawks.com
 A guide to headstamps and bullet types at Mosinnagant.net 

 
Pistol and rifle cartridges
Military cartridges
Rimmed cartridges
Weapons and ammunition introduced in 1918